The Swedish Armed Forces Music Corps (FöMus) heads all bands of the Swedish Armed Forces: the Royal Swedish Army Band, the Life Guards' Dragoon Music Corps and the Royal Swedish Navy Band in Karlskrona and the 25 bands of the Home Guard. Försvarsmusiken serves the Royal Court, Armed Forces and the Government.

It was organized in 2010 as a combined staff of three professional military bands under the armed forces. The MMD-SAF reports as part of the Life Guards, headquartered in Stockholm. The official marchpast for musicians under the FöMus is Signalmarsch No. 1 by Mats Janhagen.

Directors
2010–2015: Olle Hermansen
2015–present: Roger Lodin

See also
Music Branch (Canadian Forces)
Forsvarets musikk
Military Band Service of the Armed Forces of Russia

References

Sources
 Försvarsmusiken
 Hemvärnets musikkårer

Military music of Sweden
Swedish military bands
Military administrative corps of Sweden